The University of Ferrara Botanic Garden is a 4,500 square metre botanical garden operated by the University of Ferrara. It is located at Corso Porta Mare, 2b, I-44100 Ferrara, Emilia-Romagna, Italy, and is open weekday mornings. Admission is free.

The university's garden was originally established in 1771 at a location on the via Paradiso, but in 1963 it was moved to its present location. It currently contains about 1300 species in its greenhouse (243 m2), and some 700 species outdoors, arranged into four major sections as follows:

 Systematic - species arranged by botanic classification, with subsections for Pterophyta, Angiospermophyta, Monocotyledons, Dicotyledons
 Exotic plants
 Useful plants - subsections for fruits, medicinal plants, aromatic plants, and miscellaneous
 Theme gardens - ornamental plants in an aquatic garden, English garden, Italian garden, Japanese garden, Mediterranean garden, rock garden, and shade garden.

See also 
 List of botanical gardens in Italy

References 
 Orto Botanico dell'Università di Ferrara (Italian)
 Horti entry (Italian)

Botanical gardens in Italy
Gardens in Emilia-Romagna
Ferrara